Shenyang Aerospace University (SAU), formerly known as Shenyang Institute of Aeronautical Engineering, is a comprehensive research university in Shenyang, the capital of Liaoning province in Northeast China. It educates students for supporting the military and civil aviation industries of China.

History
Founded in 1952, the university was initially administered by the Ministry of Aeronautical & Astronautical Industry, and later by the China General Corporation of Aeronautical Industry. Since 1999, SAU has been under the administration of the Liaoning Provincial Government and is the only university owned by the China Industry and Information Technology Ministry and the Liaoning Provincial Government. It is one of the eight universities constructed by the former China National Defence Ministry and local provincial governments. In addition, it is the only university of aeronautical and astronautical engineering in Liaoning Province.

On 18 March 2010 the China Ministry of Education approved the name change from Shenyang Institute of Aeronautical Engineering (SYIAE) to Shenyang Aerospace University (SAU).

Overview

Characterized by aeronautics and astronautics, Shenyang Aerospace University is a multi-disciplinary university, which, while focusing on engineering, also covers such areas as science, liberal arts and management. The university comprises 17 schools, with over 900 lecturers, including 400 professors and associate professors. There are 20,000 full-time students in SAU. The university has over 50,000 graduates. A number of them are now working as senior engineers or executives. The recent employment of the graduates has been maintained at the average of 95.7%. Every year a large number of foreign students get admission in this university.

Undergraduate schools
School of Aerospace Engineering
School of Aero Dynamics and Energy Engineering
School of Civil Aviation and Safety Engineering
School of Mechanical and Electrical Engineering
School of Computer Science
School of Airforce Officials Training
School of Electronics Information Engineering
School of Auto Control
School of Economics and Management
School of Design Art
School of Material Science and Engineering
School of Science
School of Foreign Languages

Institutes
Institute of "Beifang" Software
Institute of "Beifang" Science and Technology
Lifelong education
Office of Social Science
Office of PE Teaching & Research
Training center of Korean Language

Graduate schools
School of Aerospace Engineering
School of Computer Science
School of Information Communication
School of Auto Control
School of Mechanical Engineering
School of Materials Science and Engineering

Universities and colleges in Shenyang
Educational institutions established in 1952
1952 establishments in China